The Queensland Railways 6D13½ class locomotive was a class of 0-6-0T steam locomotives operated by the Queensland Railways.

History
In 1904, the North Ipswich Railway Workshops assembled six 0-6-0T locomotives. The wheel sets came from B15 class locomotives, and the cylinders were purchased for an aborted project. Per Queensland Railway's classification system, they were designated the 6D13½ class, 6D representing they were a tank locomotive with six wheels, and the 13½ the cylinder diameter in inches.

They were generally used as shunters in Brisbane, but on occasions were used in Toowoomba and Warwick. In 1937–1938, all were converted to 0-6-0 tender locomotives and reclassified as the B13½ class with tenders from B13 and C15 class locomotives.

Class list

Preservation
One has been preserved:
398 at the Workshops Rail Museum

References

Railway locomotives introduced in 1904
6D13
0-6-0T locomotives
0-6-0 locomotives
3 ft 6 in gauge locomotives of Australia